The 2003 Italy rugby union tour of New Zealand was a series of matches played in June 2003 in New Zealand by the Italian team to prepare the 2003 Rugby World Cup.  No Test match was played

'Scores and results list Italy's points tally first.

Italy
tour
Italy national rugby union team tours
tour
Rugby union tours of New Zealand